Mount Engadine is a  mountain summit located in the Spray River Valley of Kananaskis Country, in the Canadian Rockies of Alberta, Canada. It was named in 1917 after HMS Engadine, a seaplane tender of the Royal Navy present at the Battle of Jutland during World War I. The mountain is located in the Kananaskis Range in Alberta.

Geology

The mountain is composed of sedimentary rock laid down during the Precambrian to Jurassic periods and was later pushed east and over the top of younger rock during the Laramide orogeny.

Climate

Based on the Köppen climate classification, Mount Engadine is located in a subarctic climate with cold, snowy winters, and mild summers. Precipitation runoff from the mountain drains into Smuts Creek and Buller Creek, which empty into Spray Lakes Reservoir.

See also
 Geology of the Rocky Mountains
 Geography of Alberta

References

External links
Mt. Engadine winter photo: Flickr

Two-thousanders of Alberta
Canadian Rockies